Phetchaburi may refer to

In Southern Thailand 
Phetchaburi, a town
Phetchaburi Province, the province of which Phetchaburi Town is the capital of
Mueang Phetchaburi district, the capital district of the province
Phetchaburi River
Phetchaburi Railway Station

In Bangkok 
Phetchaburi MRT Station, a rapid transit station